John Curtis Staton (June 9, 1902 – September 16, 1990) was a college football player and Coca-Cola executive.

Early years 
John Curtis Staton was born June 9, 1902, in Atlanta, the son of John Curtis Staton and Bivien Hammond Staton. He attended Boys High School.

Georgia Tech
Staton was an All-Southern end for William Alexander's Georgia Tech Yellow Jackets of the Georgia Institute of Technology. He played with his brother Albert Staton, and also played basketball, track, and swimming. John was elected to the Georgia Tech Athletics Hall of Fame in 1965. He was a member of the Kappa Sigma fraternity.

Coca-Cola
Staton then joined Coca-Cola in 1924, becoming vice president before retiring in 1968. It was said it was him who designed the company's first cooler and developed its first fountain dispenser. Prior to being vice president he was export manager, and his career included time spent in  several other countries including Canada, Australia, New Zealand, Brazil and Mexico.

References

1902 births
1990 deaths
Georgia Tech Yellow Jackets football players
American football ends
All-Southern college football players
Players of American football from Atlanta
Coca-Cola people